Squirt is a New Zealand children's television show, produced in Dunedin. It began airing in 1996 on TV3 and moved to TV 2 in 1997, before coming to a close on 21 November 2006. Squirt was aired every Saturday morning, originally from 7am to 9am, then from 8:30am to 10am, eventually  running from 8:30am to 9am for only 30 minutes. In the original time, cartoons were aired, such as Cow & Chicken, Batman of the Future and Earthworm Jim. There were also weekly competitions, and many informational segments such as "Out There!" and "Astounding Squirt Facts".

It was notable for Dunedin-based production company TaylorMade, and Animation Research Limited's (ARL) pioneering use of "live" motion capture, used in the 3D animation of the digital co-host Spike The Penguin. A performer was off camera in a special costume, making all the moves and vocal responses to the main host's comments, which played back in real time on a monitor for the crew, while all the motion was digitally recorded, which could then be applied to a fully rendered Spike, and composited into shot in post-production, ready for broadcast.

Presenters 
 Ryan Inglis
 Jo Holley
 Spike The Penguin (3D computer graphics penguin voiced and performed by Katie Brockie)
 Matthew Gibb
 Dominic Bowden
 Thomas Robins
 Chris Dykzeul
 Beau Jeffries
 Jason Gunn
 Gordon (animated fish)
 Hamish (animated fish; voiced by Simon McKinney)
 Newt (animated fish)

Programmes 
 Ace Ventura: Pet Detective
 The Adventures of Sam & Max: Freelance Police
 Angry Beavers
 Animorphs
 Bad Dog
 Batman of the Future
 Batman: The Animated Series
 Big Guy and Rusty the Boy Robot
 Big Wolf on Campus
 Bobby's World
 Brand Spanking New! Doug
 Bruno the Kid
 Bump in the Night
 Cow & Chicken
 Cubix
 Digimon
 Earthworm Jim
 Ed, Edd n Eddy
 Eekstravaganza
 Freakazoid
 Godzilla: The Series
 Goosebumps
 Jackie Chan Adventures
 Johnny Bravo
 Jumanji
 KaBlam!
 Mad Jack the Pirate
 Max Steel
 Men in Black: The Series
 Ninja Turtles: The Next Mutation
 Oscar and Friends
 Pee-wee's Playhouse
 Pinky and the Brain
 Problem Child
 Rocket Power
 Roughnecks: Starship Troopers Chronicles
 Rugrats
 The Secret Files of the Spy Dogs
 Silver Surfer
 Spider-Man
 Spider-Man Unlimited
 SpongeBob SquarePants
 Steven Spielberg Presents Toonsylvania
 Street Sharks
 Taz-Mania
 What's New, Scooby-Doo?
 Xyber 9
 X-Men
 X-Men: Evolution
 The Zeta Project

External links 
 

1996 New Zealand television series debuts
2006 New Zealand television series endings
1990s New Zealand television series
2000s New Zealand television series
New Zealand children's television series
Television shows funded by NZ on Air
Three (TV channel) original programming
TVNZ 2 original programming